The Maxwell-Sweet House is a historic house at 114 South College in Siloam Springs, Arkansas.  It is a two-story brick structure, roughly square in shape with a projecting front section.  It has a tile hip roof with extended eaves, and a porch that wraps around the front project, supported by brick piers with concrete capitals.  The house was built in 1921 by a prominent local banker, who lost both his business and house in 1928.  The property includes a period garage and carriage barn.

The house was listed on the National Register of Historic Places in 1988.

See also
National Register of Historic Places listings in Benton County, Arkansas

References

Houses on the National Register of Historic Places in Arkansas
Houses completed in 1921
Houses in Siloam Springs, Arkansas
National Register of Historic Places in Benton County, Arkansas